Euchromius galapagosalis is a moth in the family Crambidae. It was described by Hahn William Capps in 1966. It is found on the Galápagos Islands.

References

Crambinae
Moths described in 1966
Moths of South America